The Channing-Murray Foundation, resides in the former Unitarian Church at 1209 West Oregon Street in Urbana, Illinois, is the Unitarian-Universalist Campus Center at the University of Illinois at Urbana-Champaign. It includes a chapel and a vegetarian restaurant, Red Herring. The Foundation was established in 1954 after a merger between the Unitarian and Universalist churches in Urbana. At the time, it was also as a merger of the Murray Club of the Universalist Church in Urbana, and the Young People's Club or Unity Club of the Unitarian Church. The building was constructed in 1908 as the Unitarian Church

The Unitarian Church of Urbana building is architecturally significant, with design by Root & Siemens, and was added to the National Register of Historic Places in 1991.

See also
National Register of Historic Places listings in Champaign County, Illinois

References

External links
National Register nomination

Unitarian Universalist churches in Illinois
Buildings and structures in Urbana, Illinois
Churches completed in 1908
National Register of Historic Places in Champaign County, Illinois
Churches on the National Register of Historic Places in Illinois
Gothic Revival church buildings in Illinois
American Craftsman architecture in Illinois
1954 establishments in Illinois